CSI  Diocese of  Cochin  is one of the twenty four dioceses of the Church of South India (commonly referred to as CSI, successor of the Church of England and  other Protestant church missions  in  South India) covering the churches in Ernakulam and Thrissur districts.

History
Cochin diocese was  formed  on 9 April 2015 after a special conference of the Church synod in Chennai.
Cochin diocese has been carved out of erstwhile North Kerala Diocese and  remaining  portion  was  furnished  into  CSI  Malabar  diocese.

K. Oommen.

Bishops of the Diocese
Rt. Rev. Baker Ninan Fenn (2013 - Till date)

Extent, traditions and establishments
The Kochi diocese comprises Ernakulam and Thrissur districts, parts of Idukki and Palakkad districts and   CSI  Holy  Trinity   Church, Hinkal,  Mysore.

Its tradition is mainly  Anglican and episcopal polity is followed.

CSI  St. Francis  Church,  Fort  Cochin

St. Francis Church, Kochi situated in Fort Kochi, originally built in 1503, is the oldest European church in India and was under the authority of Portuguese, Dutch and British colonial powers and finally handed over to the Church of South India at its inception. The Portuguese explorer, Vasco da Gama's body was originally buried in this church, but after fourteen years his remains were removed to Lisbon. This church was renovated by  Rev. Thomas  Norton, CMS  missionary in an Anglican church style for a confirmation service. The  Lord's prayer is inscribed on its wooden altar screen.

CSI  All Saints'  Church,  Thrissur 

CSI All Saints'  church Thrissur was dedicated on 1 November 1842 by  CMS missionaries.

CSI Bethel Ashram, Thrissur

It was established in the year of 1934 by Zenana mission.

CMS Higher Secondary School, Thrissur

CSI  St. John the Baptist Church, Aluva

St. John the Baptist Church, Aluva built in 1891 by the leadership of  Church missionary society (CMS) and was under the auspices of former Travancore cochin Anglican diocese at its beginning and is one of the oldest CMS-built churches in Kerala. Later, It became part of CSI North Kerala diocese. When  CSI cochin diocese was established, it became under its see. Now Aluva St. John the Baptist C.S.I church is in its 125th jubilee year. Rev. Praise Thaiparambil the 20th vicar of this church after India's independence and who is the parish member ordained in the 100th year of the church and became the presbyter of his mother parish.

St. John the Baptist CSI EMHS, Aluva

CSI Karunalayam, Aluva

CSI  Christ  church, Munnar

Beautiful Gothic church built in 1910, having a steeple and stained glass windows depicting Jesus the good shepherd and saints.

CSI  Holy  trinity  English  church, Palakkad

A parish within the palakkad town with Anglican tradition.

List of Parishes under this diocese of Cochin

Greater Cochin Area

CSI  Immanuel  Cathedral, Broadway,  Ernakulam

CSI  Christ church,  Elamkulam

CSI  Ascension Church, Kakkanad

CSI Holy Trinity church, near UC college, Aluva

CSI  St John the Baptist Church, Aluva Town

CSI  St Stephen's church, Thripunithura

CSI  St  Paul's church,  Eloor

CSI  All  Saints' church, Kalamassery

CSI  St Francis' church,  Fort  Cochin

CSI  St John's  church,  Mulavukad

Thrissur  Area

CSI All  Saints' church, Thrissur

CSI St Paul's church, Kunnamkulam 

CSI St  Stephen's church, Cheroor

CSI St  Andrew's church, Kolazhy

CSI St John's church, Chalakkudy

CSI St Andrew's church, Irinjalakkuda

CSI St  John's church, Ottupara

CSI  St Paul's church, Anchery

CSI  St  John's church, Urakam

CSI  St Thomas' church, Mannuthy

CSI  St John's church, Poomala

CSI  St  John's church, Mannamangalam

Palakkad  Area

CSI Holy Trinity English church,  Palakkad

CSI St Paul's Church, Shoranur

CSI St  Andrew's church, Olavakkode

CSI St  Mary's church, Inchikkunnu

CSI St: PAUL'S CHURCH VADAKKENCHERY

Idukki  Area

CSI Christ church, Munnar

CSI St John's church, Adimali

Outside Kerala

CSI Holy Trinity church, Malayalam congregation, Mysore

See also
Church of South India
East Kerala Diocese

References

External links
CSI Immanuel Church, Ernakulam
St Francis CSI Church, Fort Kochi
South Kerala Diocese
North Kerala Diocese

Church of South India dioceses
Dioceses in Kerala